Alexandru Popescu (born 12 October 1935) is a Romanian former butterfly swimmer. He competed at the 1956 Summer Olympics and the 1960 Summer Olympics.

References

External links
 
 Interview with him in Munich, 2009, in Romanian

1935 births
Living people
Romanian male butterfly swimmers
Olympic swimmers of Romania
Swimmers at the 1956 Summer Olympics
Swimmers at the 1960 Summer Olympics
Sportspeople from Bucharest